The 2011–12 Powerade Tigers season was the 10th and final season of the franchise in the Philippine Basketball Association (PBA).

Key dates
August 28: The 2011 PBA Draft took place in Robinson's Place Ermita, Manila.

Draft picks

Roster

Philippine Cup

Eliminations

Standings

Bracket

Quarterfinals

B-Meg vs. Powerade

Semifinals

Powerade-Rain or Shine series

Finals

Commissioner's Cup

Eliminations

Standings

Seeding playoffs

Governors Cup

Eliminations

Standings

6th-seed playoffs

Transactions

Trades

Pre-season

Commissioner's Cup

Additions

Subtractions

Recruited imports

References

Powerade Tigers seasons
Powerade